The NWA Missouri Heavyweight Championship was the secondary singles championship in the National Wrestling Alliance's St. Louis Wrestling Club and Central States Wrestling promotions in the 1970s and 1980s. It was usually dominated by the area's top star, Harley Race, and as such it was considered a "stepping stone" to the NWA World Heavyweight Championship (although only Race, Terry Funk, Kerry Von Erich and Ric Flair made it; Gene Kiniski, Dory Funk, Jr. and Jack Brisco were already former World Champions upon winning the Missouri title). A version of the Missouri Championship has been documented to exist in 1899, 1921, 1933 to 1934, 1937, 1947, 1950, and 1954 to 1955, but it was only in 1972 that a serious championship was established. Prior to the creation of the NWA the championship was not recognized outside of the region and used by regional promoters, it is even possible that competing Missouri Heavyweight Championships existed. The championship was abandoned in 1986, as the Central States promotion was being consolidated under Jim Crockett Promotions in order to counter the World Wrestling Federation's national expansion.

Pre National Wrestling Alliance Title history

National Wrestling Alliance Title history

See also
National Wrestling Alliance
St. Louis Wrestling Club
Heart of America Sports Attractions

Footnotes

References
General references
 (through 2000)

National Wrestling Alliance championships
Heart of America Sports Attractions championships
National Wrestling Alliance state wrestling championships
Professional wrestling in Missouri